Priscilla Chan (born February 24, 1985) is an American philanthropist and a former pediatrician. She and her husband, Mark Zuckerberg, a co-founder and CEO of Meta Platforms, established the Chan Zuckerberg Initiative in December 2015, with a pledge to transfer 99 percent of their Facebook shares, then valued at $45 billion. She attended Harvard University and received her medical degree from the University of California, San Francisco.

Life and career 
On February 24, 1985, Chan was born in Braintree, Massachusetts, and grew up in Quincy, Massachusetts, a suburb of Boston. Her parents were Chinese immigrants from Vietnam who fled the country in refugee boats. She grew up speaking Cantonese and interpreted for her grandparents. She has two younger sisters with all siblings born in the United States. Chan's father owned a restaurant in Massachusetts, which he later sold to run a wholesale fish company in 2006.  Chan graduated valedictorian of her class from Quincy High School.

Chan entered Harvard University in 2003, where she met and began dating Mark Zuckerberg. During her time at Harvard, she participated in the Franklin Afterschool Enrichment program. After graduating in 2007 with a bachelor's degree in biology, she taught science at the private Harker School for a year, before entering medical school at the University of California, San Francisco in 2008, where she finished her pediatrics residency in 2015. She is the first college graduate in her family.

In 2016, she co-founded "The Primary School", a nonprofit organization that would provide K–12 education as well as prenatal care, in East Palo Alto, California. She is the board chair of the school.

Personal life 
Chan married Facebook founder Mark Zuckerberg on May 19, 2012, the day after the site's IPO.
Chan and Zuckerberg announced the birth of their daughter Maxima Chan Zuckerberg on December 1, 2015. On August 28, 2017, Chan gave birth to their second daughter, whom they named August. On September 21, 2022, Zuckerberg announced that he and Chan are expecting their third daughter, due in 2023.

According to a Facebook post by Zuckerberg, Chan is a non-denominational Buddhist.

Philanthropy 

Zuckerberg and Chan have pledged about $4.6 billion to charities, including a donation of $75 million to San Francisco General Hospital, where Chan worked. In 2013, they gave 18 million Facebook shares (valued at more than $970 million) to the Silicon Valley Community Foundation. The Chronicle of Philanthropy placed the couple at the top of its list of 50 most generous American philanthropists for that year. They also pledged $120 million to public schools in the San Francisco Bay Area.

On December 1, 2015, Chan and Zuckerberg posted an open Facebook letter to their newborn daughter.  They pledged to transfer 99 percent of their Facebook shares, then valued at $45 billion, to the Chan Zuckerberg Initiative, which is their new limited liability company that focuses on health and education.

Chan handles the day-to-day operations at the Chan Zuckerberg Initiative. Her charitable goals focus on education, healthcare, and science, which are closely tied to her personal background. She is considered to have had a strong influence on the philanthropy of her husband.  She was one of six nominated for The San Francisco Chronicle's third annual Visionary of the Year award in March 2017. The award honors leaders who strive to make the world a better place and also drive change by employing new, innovative business practices.

Notes

References

External links

American pediatricians
Women pediatricians
American women physicians
Physicians from California
American women philanthropists
Zuck
Zuck
Harvard College alumni
University of California, San Francisco alumni
American Buddhists
People from Palo Alto, California
People from Braintree, Massachusetts
American people of Chinese descent
1985 births
Living people
21st-century American physicians
The Harker School alumni
21st-century American women
Zuckerberg family
21st-century women philanthropists